Abhorrence is a Finnish death metal band originally formed in 1989.

History 

Abhorrence was formed in early 1989 by guitarists Tomi Koivusaari (of Violent Solution and Amorphis) and Kalle Mattsson, vocalist Jukka Kolehmainen and bassist Jussi Ahlroth (latter three whom had played together in a band called Disaster), as well as drummer Kimmo Heikkinen. For some time they played under several different names until settling on Abhorrence, playing dozens of concerts alongside bands like Xysma, Disgrace and Funebre. After recording and releasing one demo tape, titled Vulgar Necrolatry, they released a 7-inch EP on Seraphic Decay Records. Without a written contract of any kind, the band lost all of the master tapes and possible future revenues.

After several more gigs around Finland, a short visit to Norway (one gig and a party/sleepover at black metal band Mayhem's house) with their second drummer Mika Arnkil (on leave from Antidote), the band broke up in 1990. Koivusaari went on to play in Amorphis.

In 2012 Svart Records released all of their recorded material on CD and vinyl. The Completely Vulgar compilation consists of the band's demo and EP as partially remastered versions, as well as live recording from 1990. The double LP version also has lo-fi rehearsal recordings. Both versions include two previously unreleased tracks.

In 2013 the band reformed for three performances, with the original members, except for the new drummer Rainer Tuomikanto. The first show was at Bar Loose in Helsinki (under alias Bob Horrence) with Deathchain. The other performances were at Tuska Open Air Metal Festival and Hammer Open Air festival.

The performance at Tuska festival was recorded and released as Totally Vulgar – Live at Tuska 2013 live album in 2017, again by Svart Records. The band formed to play in support of the live album's release, with Waltteri Väyrynen as drummer. They played a short four date tour of Finland with Demilich and later a Nummirock festival appearance.

In early 2018 the band announced they had written some new music and made an agreement with Svart Records, regarding the release of an EP later in the year. They performed some of the new material at concerts on 10.2. at Torvi Bar in Lahti and 24.3. at Kuudes Linja club in Helsinki, supported by Corpse Molester Cult.

Members 
Current
Jussi 'Juice' Ahlroth – bass (1989–present)
Tomi Koivusaari – guitar (1989–present)
Jukka Kolehmainen – vocals (1989–present)
Kalle Mattsson – guitar (1989–present)
Waltteri Väyrynen – drums (2016–present)

Former
Rainer 'Raikku' Tuomikanto – drums (2013)
Mikael 'Arkki' Arnkil – drums (1990)
Kimmo Heikkinen – drums (1989–1990)

Discography 
 Vulgar Necrolatry (demo, 1989)
 Abhorrence 7-inch (EP, 1990)
 Completely Vulgar (CD/2LP, compilation, Svart Records 2012)
 Totally Vulgar – Live at Tuska 2013 (CD/LP, live, Svart Records 2017)
 Megalohydrothassalophobic (CD/EP, Svart Records 2018)

Official releases are available for streaming at Bandcamp.

External links 

 Abhorrence at Facebook.com
 Abhorrence at Bandcamp.com
 Abhorrence at Discogs.com
 
 Abhorrence at Svart Records.com
 Abhorrence – Death metal from finland, official homepage (out of date)

Finnish death metal musical groups
Musical groups established in 1989
Musical groups disestablished in 1990
Musical groups reestablished in 2013
Musical quintets